Sloka may refer to:

 Sloka, Latvia, a neighbourhood of Jūrmala, Latvia
 Sloka meter, a Sanskrit meter
 Śloka, a Hindu prayer
 Sloka Gora, a small settlement in central Slovenia